Scouting in the U.S. state of Oregon includes the Boy Scouts of America (BSA) and Girl Scouts (GSUSA) youth organizations, as well as newer organizations like the Baden-Powell Service Association.

Early history (1907–1950)
The Portland Council (#492) was founded in 1916. In 1929, it changed its name to the Portland Area Council (#492), and in 1966, it changed its name again to the Columbia Pacific Council (#492). Finally, in 1993, it merged into the Cascade Pacific Council .

The Salem Council (#493) was founded in 1918. In 1923, it changed its name to the Willamette District Council (#493), and in 1926, it changed its name again to the Cascade Area Council (#493).

In 1926, the Umatilla Council (#738) was formed, merging into the Blue Mountain Council in 1927. In 1926, the Eastern Oregon Area Council (#760) was formed, merging into Blue Mountain in 1932.

In 1921, the Lagrande Council (#494) was founded. It closed in 1924.

In 1922, the Astoria Council (#489) was founded. It changed its name to the Clatsop County Council (#489) in 1923. In 1927, the Clatsop County Council merged into the Portland Area Council (#492).

In 1922, the Corvallis Council (#493) was founded. It closed in 1924.

In 1922, Linn County Council (#491) was formed. It closed in 1924.

In 1924, the Bend Council (#651) was founded. It changed its name to the Central Oregon Council (#651) in 1925. It merged into Mid-Columbia Council (#494) in 1927.

In 1924, the Coos County Council (#490) was founded. It merged into the Douglas-Coos Council (#682) in 1926.

In 1924, The Dalles Council (#494) was founded. It changed its name to the Mid-Columbia Council (#494) in 1925. It changed its name to the Mid-Columbia-Deschutes Area Council (#617) in 1929. The council disbanded in 1934 and the area was served by Direct Service.

In 1924, the Douglas County Council (#682) was founded. It merged into the Douglas-Coos Council (#682) in 1926.

In 1924, the Klamath County Council (#746) was founded. It merged into Crater Lake Council (#491) in 1932.

In 1924, the Medford Council (#491) was founded. It changed its name to the Crater Lake Council (#491) in 1925.

In 1925, the Lane County Council (#697) was founded. It changed its name to the Wallamet Council (#697) in 1933. It changed its name again to the Oregon Trail Council (#697) in 1944.

In 1926, the Cascade Area Council (#493) was founded. It merged into the Cascade Pacific Council (#492) in 1993.

In 1926, the Douglas County Council (#490) was founded from the merger of the Coos County Council (#682) and the Douglas County Council (#682). It merged into the Willamette Council (#697) in 1933.

In 1927, the Benlinncoln Council (#490) was founded. In 1931 it was split with one half of the council going to the Cascade Area Council (#493) and the other half going to the Lane County Council (#697).

In 1936, the Modoc Area Council (#494) was founded. It merged into Crater Lake Council (#491) in 1993.

Recent history (1950–2010)
The Modoc Area Council (#494) merged into Crater Lake Council (#491) in 1993.

The Columbia Pacific Council (#492) merged with the Cascade Area Council (#493) to make the Cascade Pacific Council (#492) in 1993.

Boy Scouting in Oregon
There are five BSA local councils serving communities in Oregon, although not all are headquartered in Oregon.

Blue Mountain Council

The Blue Mountain Council serves Scouts in Washington and Oregon.

Cascade Pacific Council

Cascade Pacific Council serves Scouts in eighteen counties of Oregon and Washington, including

History
In 1932, the Mount Saint Helens Council (#704) merged into Portland Area Council.

Organization 
 Spirit Lake District (serving the Southern Washington Area)
 Pacific Trail District (serving the Beaverton and Hillsboro areas)
 Cascadia District (serving Portland)
 Rivers' Edge District (serving Newberg, Sherwood, and Canby)
 Santiam River District (serving the Greater Salem area)
 Timberline District (serving the area around Mount Hood)
 Mid Columbia District (serving the area around the eastern Columbia River)
 Pacific Shores District (serving the northern Oregon Coast)

Camps 

The council operates a number of camps, including;

 Aubrey Watzek Lodge, a winter recreation lodge on 12 acres of property leased from the US Forest Service
 Butte Creek Scout Ranch, a 670-acre working horse ranch south of Scotts Mills
Butte Creek Scout Ranch is a working ranch that doubles as a Cub Scout resident camp.  Consisting of over 600 acres nestled near Scotts Mills, the property first opened as a summer camp in 1997.  During the summers, it is a 3-day and 2-night camp for Cub Scouts ages 5–10.  Unlike other resident Cub camps in the council, it has a Western theme every year.  It is one of the few scout camps in the nation that includes a horse riding station.  Throughout the property, cows, goats, chickens, and sometimes pigs are present.  This property was also the first camp in the council to start a session for girls in the same age group.  Originally started in 2007, the program was called "Sisters' Camp" and had the purpose of providing Cub Scout sisters with a similar experience to their brothers.  Since 2019 the program serves girls and boys together during all summer sessions. The summer staff is primarily high school students. The property also doubles as the winter location for the council's 70+ head of horses.  Twice a year, June and August, 50 of the horses are ridden between Camp Baldwin and Butte Creek along a beautiful route over Mount Hood. The Horse Trek is open to anyone over 13, although Scouts receive a discount.  During the winter, Scouts can enjoy weekend horseback riding and camping on the property. The winters are staffed by a diverse group of volunteers who run rides and help maintain the property.
 Camp Clark, a second camp on the Meriwether Reservation near Tillamook
 Camp Cooper, 240 acres property northwest of Willamina in the coastal forest
 Camp Ireland, 12-acre property in Hillsboro
 Camp Meriwether, 790 acre beachfront property south of Cape Lookout near Tillamook
 Nanitch Lodge, a winter recreation lodge on 8 acres of property leased from the US Forest Service
 Camp Lewis, 116 acre property near Battleground, Washington
 Camp Pioneer, 48 acre property east of Salem in the Mount Jefferson Wilderness, leased from the US Forest Service
 Royce-Finel, 17 acre property near Astoria

Order of the Arrow 
 Wauna La-Mon'tay Lodge #442 Members provide thousands of hours of service every year to Cascade Pacific Council's camps.

Crater Lake Council

Crater Lake Council serves Scouts in Oregon and California.

Organization
 Wild Rivers District serves Jackson County, Oregon, Josephine County, Oregon, Siskiyou County, California, and Del Norte County, California
 Fremont District serves Crook, Jefferson and Deschutes counties in Oregon
 Klamath District serves Klamath County, Oregon, Lake County, Oregon and Modoc County, California
 Pacific Rivers District serves Humboldt County, California

Camps
 Camp Makualla is located on the shores of Crescent Lake in the heart of the Cascades and the Deschutes National Forest.
 Camp McLoughlin is located on the northwestern shoreline of Lake of the Woods of the Fremont-Winema National Forests.

Order of the Arrow
 Lo La 'Qam Geela Lodge #491

Ore-Ida Council

Ore-Ida Council serves Scouts in Idaho and Oregon.

Oregon Trail Council

The Oregon Trail Council serves more than 5,000 youth, supported by over 2,300 adults in over 260 units. We serve 6 counties in Western Oregon from the Cascades to the Coast including Eugene, Springfield, Corvallis, Roseburg, and Coos Bay. Scouts are served along the famous Oregon Coast from Lincoln City to Brookings.

Organization
 Benton District serves Benton County
 Cascade District serves Springfield, Cottage Grove, and eastern Lane County
 Chinook District serves Coos County
 Doug Fir District serves Douglas County
 Greenwood District serves Eugene and western Lane County
 Wacoma District serves Curry County
 Yaquina District serves Lincoln County

Camps

 Camp Baker
 Our flagship camp located on a private peninsula on Siltcoos Lake just outside the coastal town of Florence, Oregon. Camp Baker has been serving Scouting and western Oregon for 50 years with a high-caliber open program. Troops come from as far away as eastern Oregon, Montana, Washington, Idaho and California. 17 great meals are served from the Kenneth Ford Dining Hall. Camp Baker is a popular destination for outdoor schools, church groups and family reunions. Wheelchair-accessible campsites and cabins are available.
 Camp Melakwa
 High in the heart of the Cascades, Scouts and Scouters alike find the pinnacle of what Scouting offers. We help your troop focus on the patrol method, key skills, rank advancement and high-country wilderness adventure. The program at Camp Melakwa is tailored to promoting adventure. Our structured morning merit badge sessions give way to afternoons of exploration. Enjoy open archery, rifle, and shotgun ranges, as well as open areas in waterfront, nature, and Scoutcraft. The call of the mountain and endless trails will be a constant allure.
 Climb the Middle Sister or descend into an ancient lava tube.
 Swim, snorkel, SUP, kayak, canoe, row, and fish in our surprisingly warm crystal-clear lake.
 Attain rank on the Trail to First Class.
 Climb and rappel on natural rock.
 Day hike to one of the many surrounding lakes.
 Camp Murnane
 Marion Mooney Scout Ranch
 Kitson Hot Springs
 Weyerhaeuser Woods

Order of the Arrow
 Tsisqan Lodge #253

Girl Scouting in Oregon

There are two Girl Scout councils serving girls in Oregon.

Girl Scouts of Silver Sage

Serves girls in Malheur County, Oregon with headquarters in Boise, Idaho.

Girl Scouts of Oregon and Southwest Washington

Formed by the merger of Girl Scouts - Columbia River Council, Girl Scouts of Santiam Council, Girl Scouts of Western Rivers Council, and Girl Scouts of Winema Council in October 2008.

Service centers in Oregon
 Bend
 Eugene
 Medford
 Portland

Program centers:
 Albany Program Center is located in a residential section of Albany.
 Lebanon Program Center is a converted schoolhouse located in Lebanon.
 Newport Program Center is located in residential Newport near the beach and the Oregon Coast Aquarium.
 Seaside Program Center is located in residential Seaside near the beach.

Summer resident camps
 Camp Arrowhead is  located in the Gorge near Stevenson, Washington. Camp Arrowhead has 260 acres of forest, meadows, trails, and a lake. It was opened in 1948.
 Camp Cleawox is located two miles south of Florence in the Oregon Dunes National Recreation Area. This  site is situated on a freshwater lake. Girl Scouts first started camping there before 1930 and in 1938/1939 substantial work was done by the Civilian Conservation Corps.  The property was also leased by other groups until 1949.
 Camp Whispering Winds is located in the forested hills of Kings Valley. The camp includes  and a central lake.

Outdoor Program Centers:
 The Homestead Outdoor Program Center is  located on the historically significant Creighton Homestead in Rhododendron at the base of Mount Hood.
 Mountaindale Outdoor Program Center is located off Sunset Highway in North Plains. Mountaindale has  of woods, a meadow, and a pond.
 Ruth Hyde Outdoor Program Center is  about seven miles west of Grants Pass.

Baden-Powell Service Association
The Baden-Powell Service Association has six chartered groups in the Portland, Oregon area—more than any other city in the United States.

See also

 Scouting in Idaho
 The Scout (Portland, Oregon)

External links

References

Youth organizations based in Oregon
Oregon
Western Region (Boy Scouts of America)